This is a list of species in the genus Chrysops.

Chrysops species

References

Chrysops